John R. Miles (born July 30, 1942) is an American author.  He is a winner of the Pulitzer Prize, a Guggenheim Fellowship and the MacArthur Fellowship. His writings on religion, politics, and culture have appeared in numerous national publications, including The Atlantic Monthly, The New York Times, The Boston Globe, The Washington Post, Los Angeles Times, and Commonweal Magazine.

Miles treats his biblical subjects neither as transcendent deities nor historical figures, but as literary protagonists.  His first book, God: A Biography, won the Pulitzer Prize for Biography or Autobiography in 1996, and has been translated into sixteen languages. His second book Christ: A Crisis in the Life of God, was named a New York Times Notable Book of 2002. Miles is general editor of the Norton Anthology of World Religions (November 2014). Miles' book God in the Qur'an was published in 2018, the third in his God in Three Classic Scriptures series. Miles' next related book is Religion as We Know It: An Origin Story, (Nov. 12, 2019) which examines when religion became a distinct area of thought.

Miles' most recent book is co-written with Mark C. Taylor, and is titled A Friendship in Twilight: Lockdown Conversations on Death and Life, (July 5, 2022) a series of emails exchanged during the course of the pandemic in 2020.

Career
Born in Chicago, the eldest child in a Roman Catholic family, Miles was a Jesuit seminarian from 1960 to 1970, studying at Xavier University in Cincinnati, Pontifical Gregorian University in Rome, and Hebrew University in Jerusalem before completing a doctorate in the Department of Near Eastern Languages at Harvard University.  He is fluent in several languages, including French, Italian, German, Hebrew, and Aramaic.

Over a period of more than 35 years (1975–2010), Miles has been an editor at Doubleday, the executive editor at the University of California Press, the literary (book review) editor at the Los Angeles Times, a member of the Times editorial board, and the Senior Adviser to the Getty Trust at the J. Paul Getty Museum.

Miles most recently served on the faculty of the University of California, Irvine, Department of English, teaching religion. Miles was the 2018-2019 Corcoran Visiting Chair in Christian-Jewish Relations at Boston College.

Works
Forward for Islamic Political Ethics. Princeton Paperbacks. July 2002. ISBN 0691113106.

References

External links
Jack Miles Online
Biography and index of columns written for Beliefnet

1942 births
Living people
American Episcopalians
20th-century American Jesuits
American book editors
The Atlantic (magazine) people
Critics of atheism
Former Jesuits
Former Roman Catholics
Harvard University alumni
Hebrew University of Jerusalem alumni
Journalists from California
MacArthur Fellows
Pontifical Gregorian University alumni
Pulitzer Prize for Biography or Autobiography winners
University of California, Irvine faculty
Writers from Chicago
Xavier University alumni
American religion academics
American scholars of Islam
Presidents of the National Book Critics Circle